The Siamese–Vietnamese War of 1831–1834, also known as the Siamese-Cambodian War of 1831–1834, was sparked by a Siamese invasion force under General Bodindecha that was attempting to conquer Cambodia and southern Vietnam. After initial success and the defeat of the Khmer Army at the Battle of Kompong Cham in 1832, the Siamese advance was repelled in southern Vietnam in 1833 by the military forces of the Nguyễn dynasty. Upon the outbreak of a general uprising in Cambodia and Laos, the Siamese withdrew, and Vietnam was left in control of Cambodia.

Background
Both Siam and Vietnam emerged as the primary powers in Indochina by the early 19th century and increasingly sought to dominate Cambodia and Laos in their effort to gain hegemony over the Lower Mekong Basin. The internal struggles between factions of the Cambodian royal families during the Cambodian Dark Ages had Siam and Vietnam aggressively intervene on opposite sides to maximize their influences over Cambodia. They adopted the tradition of taking members of the Cambodian royal family hostage, interfered in marriage policies, influenced and orchestrated their protégés, and demanded loyalty.

In 1806, Ang Chan II was crowned King of Cambodia by the Siamese, but he eventually became pro-Vietnamese. He did not attend the funeral of Siamese King Rama I in 1809 and sent his younger brothers Prince Ang Snguon and Prince Ang Em to Bangkok in his stead. King Rama II then made Prince Ang Snguon the Uprayorach (viceroy) and Prince Ang Em the Ouparach (deputy viceroy), thus placing the two princes under Siamese overlordship. In 1811, Prince Ang Sngoun rebelled against his brother Ang Chan. That led to a nation-wide rebellion. The Siamese court sent Chao Phraya Yommaraj Noi to lead an army to Oudong and settle the issues. Upon the arrival of a Siamese army in support of Prince Ang Sngoun, King Ang Chan fled to Saigon under the protection of Vietnam. Prince Ang Em and Ang Duong, the younger brothers of King Ang Chan, also joined the Siamese. Yommaraj Noi burnt down Oudong and Phnom Penh and took with him Princes Ang Sngoun, Ang Em, and Ang Duong to Bangkok. Emperor Gia Long ordered Lê Văn Duyệt to restore King Ang Chan at Phnom Penh in 1813. Cambodia had thus moved towards Vietnamese domination. Prince Ang Sngoun died at Bangkok in 1816 and left only his younger brothers: Prince Ang Em and Ang Duong as the Cambodian princes in Bangkok.

After his initial defeat in the Lao rebellion in 1827, King Anouvong of Vientiane fled to the Nghệ An Province in Vietnam. Emperor Minh Mạng accommodated the Lao king and sent his envoys to bring King Anouvong back to Vientiane to negotiate with the Siamese. However, Anouvong later ambushed the Siamese garrisons at Vientiane, and Siam was convinced that Vietnam was supporting King Anouvong in his resistance to Siamese domination.

When Anouvong was defeated again in 1828 and fled to Xiangkhouang, Chao Noy, the ruler of Muang Phuan, a former vassal to Anouvong that later became a vassal of Vietnam, revealed the whereabouts of Anouvong to Chao Phraya Bodindecha, which led to the capture of Anouvong. Emperor Minh Mạng then summoned Chao Noy to Huế and had him executed. Emperor Minh Mạng later annexed the Kingdom of Muang Phuan to direct rule of Vietnam, and it became the province of Trấn Ninh.

Lê Văn Duyệt had been a powerful mandarin of southern Vietnam and exerted his influence over Cambodia. After his death in 1832, Emperor Minh Mạng condemned Lê Văn Duyệt to the charge of treason and prosecuted his associates. Lê Văn Khôi, the adoptive son of Lê Văn Duyệt, led the Lê Văn Khôi revolt in May 1833 and took Saigon. King Rama III then took the opportunity to end the Vietnamese influence in Cambodia and in the region. Rama III initiated the Siamese campaign to bring Prince Ang Em to the Cambodian throne and to take Saigon.

Siamese preparations
King Rama III arranged the Siamese forces into the following routes:
 Chao Phraya Bodindecha would lead a land army of 40,000 men to bring Prince Ang Em and Ang Duong to Cambodia and to proceed to take Saigon.
 Chao Phraya Phraklang would lead a galley fleet of 10,000 men to attack Hà Tiên and to converge with the land army at Saigon.
 Phra Mahathep Pom and Phra Ratchawarin Kham would attack Xiangkhouang and Nghệ An Province through Khorat Plateau and Laos.

Military campaigns

Siamese invasion of Cambodia, Hà Tiên, and An Giang

All three Siamese armies left Bangkok on the same day on November 23, 1833. The main column of Chao Phraya Bodindecha marched from Battambang to seize Pursat and Kampong Chhnang. King Ang Chan of Cambodia, upon hearing news of Siamese invasion, organized Cambodian forces to resist the Siamese. However, Cambodia was able to muster a troop of only 300 men in short period of time. Oknha Chakrey Long led the Cambodian army against Siamese vanguard forces of 5,000 men in the Battle of Kampong Cham in December 1833. Chakrey Long was defeated and fled to Ba Phnum. After the defeat of Chakrey Long, King Ang Chan and his court fled on December 31 to Long Hồ, in Vĩnh Long Province. Bodindecha then marched his armies through Cambodia without further resistances. The Siamese general left Princes Ang Em and Ang Duong to take control in Phnom Penh and proceeded to Ba Phnum.

The fleet of Phraklang reached Hà Tiên in January 1834. The Vietnamese, who had been preoccupied with Lê Văn Khôi's rebellion, were caught unprepared, and the Siamese quickly took Hà Tiên. Phraklang then sailed his fleet upstream the Vĩnh Tế Canal and also quickly took Châu Đốc in the An Giang Province. Bodindecha, who had reached Ba Phnum, sent his brother-in-law Chao Phraya Nakhon Ratchasima to bring 7,000 men eastwards through Ba Phnum district directly to Saigon  Bodindecha himself joined Phraklang at Châu Đốc. Emperor Minh Mạng then ordered Trương Minh Giảng and Nguyễn Xuân to counter the Siamese offensives in An Giang.

Battle of Vàm Nao
To reach Saigon from Châu Đốc, the Siamese fleet had to cross from the Bassac River to the Mekong via the Vàm Nao Canal. Chao Phraya Bodindecha merged his army into Phraklang's fleet and the massive Siamese fleet proceeded along the Bassac River and reached the Vàm Nao Canal or Thuận Cảng Canal on January 21, 1834, where they met the Vietnamese fleet. The Battle of Vàm Nao ensued and continued for ten days. The Siamese initially prevailed. The Vietnamese retreated towards the Mekong and the Siamese pressed on the attack. Bodindecha ordered his fleet to disembark and attack the Vietnamese on land but was repelled by Vietnamese General Phạm Hữu Tâm. The admirals of Phraklang's fleet, however, refused to engage with the Vietnamese fleet. Phraklang himself had to board a small boat to encourage his admirals to attack but to no avail. Vietnamese reinforcements, including more than 100 battle junks, led by Tống Phước Lương, arrived and the overwhelming number of the Vietnamese engaged Bodindecha's armies. The Siamese were unable to withstand the Vietnamese, and both Bodindecha and Phraklang decided to retreat on January 31, 1834 or in February 1834.

Siamese retreat and Vietnamese offensives
After the Battle of Vàm Nao, the Siamese retreated to Châu Đốc on February 2, 1834. Trương Minh Giảng capitalized on the victory by sending a fleet to follow the Siamese and attack Châu Đốc. Chao Phraya Bodindecha ordered the Siamese to fire upon the disembarking Vietnamese, which resulted in bodies piling on the river bank. Phraklang then retreated further to Hà Tiên through the Vĩnh Tế Canal and carried off the local population of Banteai Meas, Kampot, and Kampong Som to be resettled in Chanthaburi. The water of the Vĩnh Tế Canal was too shallow for the galleys to proceed.

Phraklang then ordered some of the galleys to be pulled by elephants to Kampot. However, the Cambodians revolted and murdered the mahouts, taking all of the elephants. As the Vietnamese kept attacking Châu Đốc, Bodindecha decided to abandon Châu Đốc, retreat from Cambodia to Chantaburi, and take along as much of the local population as he could find on the way back.

Oknha Chakrey Long the Cambodian commander, who had earlier fled to Ba Phnum, organized Cambodian resistant forces with Oknha Yumreach Ho near Prey Veng. Chao Phraya Nakhon Ratchasima and Phraya Ratchanikul, who had led the Siamese troops from Ba Phnum eastward to Saigon, were attacked by Oknhas Chakrey Long and Yumreach Ho at Prey Veng and realized that the main Siamese forces had already retreated. Siamese commanders Nakhon Ratchasima and Ratchanikul returned to the Mekong but found that all boats to cross the river had vanished and so built a pontoon bridge to cross. Internal dissent caused some contingent commanders to leave the army group and marched northwards along the Mekong, where they were massacred. Chao Phraya Nakhon Ratchasima and Phraya Ratchanikul eventually crossed the Mekong and engaged the Cambodian insurgents. Chao Phraya Bodindecha ordered Chao Phraya Nakhon Ratchasima and Phraya Ratchanikul to retreat to Nakhon Ratchasima.

Trương Minh Giảng reconquered Châu Đốc and Hà Tiên. Bodindecha instructed Princes Ang Em and Ang Duong at Phnom Penh to destroy the citadel, burn the city, and march all inhabitants to Battambang. However, revolts against the Siamese invaders broke out in Phnom Penh and the rest of Cambodia under the co-ordinated leadership of two Khmer magistrates, Chakrey Long and Yumreach. All further hostile acts of Siam met massive resistance. Bodindecha and the two princes then retreated towards Siam. Bodindecha reached Pursat on February 15 and then retreated further to the Siamese-held Battambang.

In 1834, Viceroy Trương Minh Giảng and his vassal king, Ang Chan, returned to Phnom Penh. Vietnamese rule in Cambodia had been established. King Ang Chan awarded Oknha Chakrey Long with the position of Chauvea Tolaha or Prime Minister and Oknha Yumreach Hu with the position of Samdach Chauponhea.

Northern Fronts
Phra Mahathep Pom and Phra Ratchawarin Kham reached their respective destinations in January 1834. Phra Mahathep Pom stationed at Nakhon Phanom and Phra Ratchawarin Kham at Nongkhai. Phra Mahathep Pom led a Siamese army to attack the Lao city of Mahaxay, which had been under Vietnamese rule. He then proceeded to attack Phu Thai communities of modern Savannakhet Province including Muang Pong, Muang Phalan and Muang Champhone. The Siamese relocated the Phu Thai people to settle in what is now Nakhon Phanom Province and the surrounding areas.

After the execution of Chao Noy of Muang Phuan at Huế, Emperor Minh Mạng appointed a new ruler to Muang Phuan in 1834. Phra Ratchawarin Kham and Phra Patumthewa the governor of Nongkhai sent messages to the ruler of Muang Phuan to defect to the Siamese side. The ruler of Muang Phuan decided to join the Siamese cause, and Phra Ratchawarin Kham led the Siamese army to capture Muang Phuan and defeated the Vietnamese forces. Muang Phuan, as a tributary state to Siam, was too far from Siamese influence and was hard to defend. Siam then decided to dissolve the Kingdom of Muang Phuan altogether. Nearly all of the Phuan people of Muang Phuan were forcibly relocated to Nan, Sukhothai, Uttaradit, and Phitsanulok Provinces, and Muang Phuan was left largely deserted. A recent study in 2015 found that some of the displaced Phuan people eventually reached as far as Banteay Meanchey and Battambang provinces of Cambodia, where they are misidentified as Liao (Lao) instead of Phuan.

Aftermath and Prelude to 1841–1845 war
The Siamese armies had returned by May 1834. The Siamese retreat left Vietnam in full control of Cambodia. Vietnam, led by Trương Minh Giảng, established Nam Vang or Phnom Penh as headquarter. King Ang Chan of Cambodia died in January 1835. Ang Chan did not have a son but had four daughters; Ang Baen, Ang Mey, Ang Peou and Ang Sngon. Siam had Prince Ang Em, younger brother of Ang Chan, appointed as the governor of Battambang. With the Princes Ang Em and Ang Duong on the Siamese side, Trương Minh Giảng proposed to make Princess Ang Mey, Ang Chan's second daughter, the queen regnant of Cambodia. Princess Ang Baen, the eldest daughter, was surpassed for her sympathy with the Siamese cause and the fact that her mother was a daughter of Chao Phraya Abhaybhubet the Siam-appointed governor of Battambang. In 1836, Vietnam annexed Cambodia into direct rule as the Trấn Tây province with Trương Minh Giảng invested with the title Trấn Tây tướng quân (Hán tự: 鎭西將軍). Vietnamese governors and officials were installed in Cambodia and native Cambodian mandarins were left with minimal power.

Siam reinforced and prepared itself for future campaigns. Phraklang supervised the construction of larger galleys and the fortification of Chanthaburi. Samut Songkhram, Chachoengsao, Battambang and Siemreap were all fortified against possible incursions. In 1836, Manpower survey was made by Chao Phraya Bodindecha in Siam-controlled parts of Cambodia and Isan-Laos Region.

Prince Ang Em, the governor of Battambang, decided to defect to the Vietnamese side in November 1838. He arrested Siamese officials in Battambang and, along with its inhabitants, deported them to join Trương Minh Giảng at Phnom Penh in hope that Vietnam would make him King of Cambodia. However, Trương Minh Giảng arrested Prince Ang Em and sent him to Huế. This incident initiated new conflicts. Chao Phraya Bodindecha hurriedly brought army to Battambang to placate the situation. In 1840, Princess Ang Baen was found collaborating with the Siamese. Minh Mạng completely lost his trust in the Cambodian princesses. Queen Ang Mey and her sisters were demoted in status. Ang Baen was sentenced to death by drowning at Long Hồ. Ang Mey and her remaining sisters were carried off to Poulo Condore for imprisonment.

In 1840, Cambodian native mandarins arose against their Vietnamese overlords and massacred many Vietnamese officials in Cambodian rebellion (1840). The Cambodian governor of Pursat approached Chao Phraya Bodindecha at Battambang asking for Siamese support against Vietnam. This led to the new round of conflicts; the Siamese–Vietnamese War of 1841–1845.

See also
 Lê Văn Khôi revolt
 Siamese-Vietnamese wars

References

External links 
 History: Between The Elephant And The Dragon, Part2
 1750-1774
 Siam Mapped by Thongchai Winichakul
 Wars of Vietnam until 1508

Wars involving Cambodia
Wars involving the Rattanakosin Kingdom
Military history of Nguyen Vietnam
Conflicts in 1831
Conflicts in 1832
Conflicts in 1833
Conflicts in 1834
19th century in Cambodia
1830s in Siam
History of An Giang Province
History of Kiên Giang Province
Invasions of Cambodia
19th-century military history of Thailand